Enora Latuillière (born 31 July 1992) is a French biathlete. She competed in the 2014/15 World Cup season, and represented France at the Biathlon World Championships 2015 in Kontiolahti.

References

1992 births
Living people
French female biathletes
People from Chamonix
Biathlon World Championships medalists
Sportspeople from Haute-Savoie
21st-century French women